Christiane Guhel is a French retired ice dancer. With her husband Jean Paul Guhel, she is the 1962 European champion, 1962 World silver medalist, and 1960 World bronze medalist.

Results

Ice Dance
(with Jean Paul Guhel)

References

 

French female ice dancers
Year of birth missing (living people)
Living people
World Figure Skating Championships medalists
European Figure Skating Championships medalists
20th-century French women